K.P. Dhanraj (2 May 1925 – 26 April 1997) was an Indian association football player, one of the member of iconic "Pancha Pandavas" of East Bengal Club.

Playing career
He was part of the team that played against France at the 1948 Summer Olympics where India lost the match 1–2. He appeared with East Bengal from 1949 to 1953 and again from 1957 to 1959, and captained the team in 1953–54.

Honours
East Bengal
 IFA Shield: 1949, 1950, 1951, 1958
 Calcutta Football League: 1950

Mysore
Santosh Trophy: 1946–47

Individual
 Calcutta Football League top scorer: 1950 (with 18 goals)

References

External links
 K.P.Dhanraj at Olympedia

1924 births
1997 deaths
Indian footballers
India international footballers
Footballers from Hyderabad, India
East Bengal Club players
Olympic footballers of India
Footballers at the 1948 Summer Olympics
Association football forwards
Calcutta Football League players